Jacklyn Wu Chien-lien (born 3 July 1968) is a Taiwanese actress and singer who began her career in Hong Kong. 
She graduated from Taipei National University of Arts.

Career 
In 1990, Wu's acting career began. For her first acting role, Johnnie To cast her opposite Andy Lau in A Moment of Romance (1990). Wu achieved international recognition for her role in award-winning director Ang Lee's 1994 feature film Eat Drink Man Woman, in which she played the second of three sisters.

Her most acclaimed role to date is in Ann Hui's Eighteen Springs (1997), for which she received a Hong Kong Film Award Best Actress nomination and won the Hong Kong Film Critics Society Best Actress Award.

Wu has also acted in television series produced in Taiwan, mainland China, and Singapore. Since the turn of the millennium, her output has dwindled. Her last film appearance was in the 2004 Hong Kong film Jiang Hu.

Discography 
 Love is Simple (1994)
 Inner Drama (1995)
 Terribly Upset (1995)
 Waiting Because of Love (1995)
 Come Back Home (1996)
 Hope (1997)

Filmography

References

External links 
 

1968 births
Living people
20th-century Hong Kong women singers
Hong Kong film actresses
Taiwanese women singers
Taiwanese film actresses
TVB actors
People from Yunlin County
20th-century Taiwanese actresses
21st-century Taiwanese actresses
Taiwanese idols
Hong Kong idols
Taiwanese-born Hong Kong artists